Agapanthia boeberi is a species of longhorn beetle in the subfamily Lamiinae that are endemic to Lebanon.

References

boeberi
Beetles described in 1806
Endemic fauna of Lebanon
Beetles of Asia